Wascana Review was a biannual literary magazine, established in 1966, published by the University of Regina. The magazine was published open access, beginning with vol. 42 (2007). Due to decreases in funding of the English Department at the University of Regina, it ceased publication in 2012.

The review focused on essays, articles, and poetry by contemporary authors. Its contributors included Di Brandt, Elizabeth Brewster, Sharon Butala, Lorna Crozier, Northrop Frye, Janette Turner Hospital, Linda Hutcheon, Mark Kingwell, Robert Kroetsch, Susan Musgrave, Al Purdy, Leon Rooke, Guy Vanderhaeghe, Tom Wayman, Susan McCaslin, Lance Woolaver, and George Woodcock. It contained video and sound files, as well as text.

References

1966 establishments in Canada
2012 disestablishments in Canada
Biannual magazines published in Canada
Defunct literary magazines published in Canada
English-language magazines
Magazines established in 1966
Magazines disestablished in 2012
Magazines published in Saskatchewan
University of Regina